The lirnyk (Ukrainian: лірник; plural лірники - lirnyky) were itinerant Ukrainian musicians who performed religious, historical and epic songs to the accompaniment of a lira, the Ukrainian version of the hurdy-gurdy.

Lirnyky were similar to and belonged to the same guilds as the better known bandura players known as kobzars. However, the lirnyk played the lira, a kind of crank-driven hurdy-gurdy, while the kobzars played the lute-like banduras. Lirnyky were usually blind or had some major disability. 

They were active in all areas of Ukraine from (at least) the 17th century on. The tradition was discontinued in Eastern/Central Ukraine in the mid-1930s, some lirnyky were seen in the regions of Western Ukraine until the 1970s and even the 1980s. 

Today, the repertoire of the instrument is mostly performed by educated, sighted performers. Notable performers of the lira include Mykhailo Khai, Vadym "Yarema" Shevchuk, Volodymyr Kushpet and Andrii Liashuk.

See also
Blind musicians
Bandurist
Hurdy-gurdy
Kobzar
Persecuted bandurists

Sources

Humeniuk, A. - Ukrainski narodni muzychni instrumenty - Kiev: Naukova dumka, 1967
Mizynec, V. - Ukrainian Folk Instruments - Melbourne: Bayda books, 1984

17th-century establishments in Ukraine
1980s disestablishments in Ukraine
Blind musicians
Disability in Ukraine
Ukrainian music
Hurdy-gurdy players
Kobzarstvo
Entertainment occupations
Occupations in music
Obsolete occupations